Guindy National Park is a   protected area of Tamil Nadu, located in Chennai, India, is the 8th-smallest National Park of India and one of the very few national parks situated inside a city. The park is an extension of the grounds surrounding Raj Bhavan, formerly known as the 'Guindy Lodge', the official residence of the governor of Tamil Nadu, India. It extends deep inside the governor's estate, enclosing beautiful forests, scrub lands, lakes and streams.

The park has a role in both ex-situ and in-situ conservation and is home to 400 blackbucks, 2,000 spotted deers, 24 jackals, a wide variety of snakes, geckos, tortoises and over 130 species of birds, 14 species of mammals, over 60 species of butterflies and spiders each, a wealth of different invertebrates—grasshoppers, ants, termites, crabs, snails, slugs, scorpions, mites, earthworms, millipedes, and the like. These are free-ranging fauna and live with the minimal of interference from human beings. The only major management activity is protection as in any other in-situ conservation area. The park attracts more than 700,000 visitors every year.

History
In the early 1670s, a garden space was carved out of the Guindy forest and a residence called the Guindy Lodge was built by Governor William Langhorne (1672–1678), which had helped make St Thomas Mount a salubrious place for rest and recreation. The remaining of the forest area was owned by a British citizen named Gilbert Rodericks from whom it was purchased by the government in 1821 for a sum of  35,000. The original area of 505 ha was established as a Reserve Forest in 1910. Although it was speculated that Chital (spotted deer) were introduced into the park probably after 1945, it is now known that they already existed in the year 1900 along with other antelope during the tenure of the colonial Governor of Madras Sir Arthur Havelock (1895-1900)  Between 1961 and 1977, about 172 ha of the forest, primarily from the Raj Bhavan, was transferred to various government departments in order to build educational institutions and memorials. In 1958, a portion of the forest area was transferred to the Union Education Ministry for establishing the Indian Institute of Technology, Madras. In the same year, another portion of the land was transferred to the Forest Department for creating the Guindy Deer Park and Children's Park at the instance of the then prime minister of India, Jawaharlal Nehru. Memorials for Rajaji and Kamaraj were built in 1974 and 1975, respectively, from parcels of land acquired from the Raj Bhavan. In 1977, the forest area was transferred to the Tamil Nadu Forest Department. In 1978, the whole of the remaining area, popularly known then as the Guindy Deer Park, was declared a national park. It was walled off from the adjacent Raj Bhavan and Indian Institute of Technology Madras Campus in the late 1980s.

Habitats
The Guindy National Park, Raj Bhavan and IIT-Madras habitat complex has historically enjoyed a certain degree of protection and has continued to support some of the last remnants of the natural habitats that typify the natural range of plant and animal biodiversity of the Coromandel-Circar coastal plains in the northeastern Tamil Nadu. The ecosystem consists of the rare tropical dry evergreen scrub and thorn forests receiving about 1200 mm of rainfall annually. This vegetation has been reclassified as the Albizia amara community. The region's physiognomy occurs as discontinuous or dense scrub-woodlands and thickets, containing species such as introduced Acacia planifrons, Clausena dentata shrubs, palmyrah palm (Borassus flabellifer), Randia dumetorum, Randia malabarica, Carissa spinarum, Acacia chundra, exotic cactus Cereus peruviana and Glycosmis mauritiana.

The park has a tropical dissymmetric climate. The mean annual temperatures are 32.9 °C (maximum) and 24.3 °C (minimum). Rainfall ranges from 522 to 2,135 mm, with an average annual rainfall of 1,215 mm. The summer season in April and May determines the peculiar vegetation of the Coromandel-Circar coast. Between June and December, wet season prevails, with dry season occurring between January and March. The area also has a cleared meadow called Polo Field measuring about 230 × 160 m. The park also has a lake known as the 'Tangal Eri'.

The park is protected by a perimeter wall for a length of 9.5 km. There is an extensive network of roads and trails. The road network covers about 14 km within the park. The park has two large tanks, namely, Kathan Kollai (KK Tank) and Appalam Kolam (AK Tank), in addition to two ponds, which usually dry up during summer. The presence of the park and the surrounding green areas resulted in the byname, the green lungs of Chennai, for the Adyar–Guindy area.

Flora
The park has a dry evergreen scrub and thorn forest, grasslands and water bodies with over 350 species of plants including shrubs, climbers, herbs and grasses and over 24 variety of trees, including the sugar-apple, Atlantia monophylla, wood-apple, and neem. This flora provides an ideal habitat for over 150 species of birds. About one-sixth of the park has been left as open grassland to preserve that habitat for blackbucks. Though both the species of blackbuck and spotted deer have their natural habitat in grassland, the spotted deer prefer bushes and can adjust in land covered with shrubbery.

Fauna

There are over 14 species of mammals including  blackbuck, chital or spotted deer, jackal, small Indian civet, common palm civet, bonnet macaque, hyena, pangolin, hedgehog, common mongoose and three-striped palm squirrel. The park also has black-naped hare and several species of bats and rodents.

The near threatened blackbuck, considered the flagship species of the park, was introduced in 1924 by Lord Willingdon and has seen a population decline in recent times. It is now known that both Blackbucks and Chitals were a native faunal element of the park.   Some albino male blackbucks were also introduced by the Maharaja of Bhavnagar. Per the census conducted on 29 February 2004, the population of Blackbuck was 405 (10 spotted in the IIT campus). The chital population in the Park, appears to have been steady or even increased in the last century. Per the census conducted on 29 February 2004, the population of the spotted deer was 2,650. Of these, 1,743 were female and 336 were fawns. The census was taken in the Guindy National Park and the adjoining areas of the Indian Institute of Technology and the Raj Bhavan campus using King's transect method, which would only reveal the numbers close to the actual figure.

The park has over 150 species of birds including grey partridge, crow pheasant, parrot, quail, paradise flycatcher, black-winged kite, honey buzzard, pariah kite, golden-backed woodpecker, yellow-wattled lapwing, red-wattled lapwing, blue-faced malkoha, shrikes, Asian koel, minivets, munias, parakeet, tailor bird, robin, drongo, and stone curlew. Bird watchers anticipate migratory birds here like teals, garganeys, pochards, medium egrets, large egrets, night herons, pond herons and open-billed storks every fall season.

The park is home to about 9 species of amphibians. There are also many kinds of reptiles, including saw-scaled viper and the fan-throated lizard. Some species of tortoise and turtles—especially the endangered star tortoise, lizards, geckos, chameleons and the common Indian monitor lizard—are found here, as well as a large variety of insects including 60 species of spiders and 60 species of butterflies.

Guindy Snake Park and Children's Park

Guindy Snake Park, formerly the location of Madras Crocodile Bank Trust, is next to the Guindy National Park. The Snake Park in Chennai gained statutory recognition as a medium zoo from the Central Zoo Authority in 1995. There one can see king cobra, pythons, vipers and other reptiles.

The Children's Park gained statutory recognition as a medium zoo from the Central Zoo Authority in 1995. Animals in the Children's Park include black buck, sambar, spotted deer, porcupine, jackal, python, grey pelican, night heron, cormorant, cockatiel, parrot, mongoose, common peafowl, crocodile, common otter, rhesus monkey, bonnet monkey and common langur. The Children's Park also exhibits a fossilised tree specimen which is estimated to be about 20 million years old and a statue of a Tyrannosaurus at the entrance. The Children's Park and the Snake Park have separate entrances and independent entry fees. Drinking water, vendors and catering are available. The entrance lies on the busy Sardar Patel Road next to the Adyar Cancer Institute. In December 2019, an augmented reality (AR) show with a capacity of 20 persons was opened to public.

Visitor information

There is a new interpretation center about the biodiversity of the park. Entry into this protected reserve is restricted, and visitors can go into the core area only when escorted by a forest ranger from the Forests Department. The rear southeast edge of the park adjoins the campus of Indian Institute of Technology, Madras. Along its northern fringes on the Sardar Patel road are the Cancer Institute, CLRI campus, the Anna University, the Raj Bhavan and spaces allotted for the Gandhi Mandapam, Kamaraj Memorial and Rajaji Memorial.

The visiting timings at the Snake Park is from 9.00 am to 5.30 pm Children's Park is from 9.00 am to 6.00 pm and is open on all days except Tuesday which is declared as a holiday.

The nearest railway station is the Kasturba Nagar MRTS station which is less than a kilometer away. Guindy railway station on the Chennai Suburban Railway is 1 km away. Chennai Egmore railway station is 9 km away. Chennai Central railway station is 12 km away. Chennai International Airport is 8 km away.

See also
 Arignar Anna Zoological Park
 Biodiversity
 Birding in Chennai
 Parks in Chennai
 Chennai Snake Park
 Endangered species
 Environmental enrichment
 List of Conservation topics
 Wildlife Institute of India (WII)
 Madras Crocodile Bank
 Pulicat Lake Bird Sanctuary
 Vedanthangal Bird Sanctuary
 Wildlife conservation

References

External links
 Enquiry Form

National parks in Tamil Nadu
Geography of Chennai
Tourist attractions in Chennai
Protected areas established in 1977
Parks in Chennai
Urban forests
1977 establishments in Tamil Nadu